Lukas Schenkel (born 1 April 1984) is a Swiss former professional footballer who played as a centre-back.

External links
 
 

1984 births
Living people
Association football central defenders
Swiss men's footballers
Swiss Super League players
FC Thun players
FC Wil players
FC St. Gallen players
AC Bellinzona players
South African soccer players
Swiss people of South African descent
FC Münsingen players